In 1903, commissioned by the city of Seattle, Washington, the Olmsted Brothers landscape architects planned many of the parks in the City of Seattle as part of a comprehensive plan to create a greenbelt throughout the city.  The planning continued in several phases, culminating in the final Olmsted-planned park, Washington Park Arboretum in 1936.

The existing Seattle Parks and Recreation system has been described as "one of the best-preserved Olmsted park systems in the country". In 2016, the Olmsted parks system was added to the National Register of Historic Places as a multiple property submission.

1903 plan

Sunset Hill Park 
Green Lake Park
Ravenna & Cowen Park
Woodland Park
Magnolia Bluff 
Interlaken Park
Volunteer Park
Cal Anderson Park
Madrona Park
Frink Park
Colman Park
Mount Baker Park
Jefferson Park
Seward Park

1908 plan

Hiawatha Playfield 
Schmitz Park
Lincoln Park

Other

Alaska-Yukon-Pacific Exposition (current University of Washington main campus)

The City of Seattle Parks and Recreation department lists a number of other parks, playgrounds, and playfields "influenced or recommended" by the Olmsteds, including the city's largest park:  Discovery Park.

References

Further reading

 

Seattle Olmsted